Magidson is a surname. Notable people with the surname include:

David Magidson (born 1963), American actor
Herb Magidson (1906–1986), American popular lyricist